Prochoreutis talyshensis is a moth in the family Choreutidae. It was described by Aleksandr Sergeievich Danilevsky in 1969. It is found in Azerbaijan.

References

Prochoreutis
Moths described in 1969